The Sky-Bike is a 1967 colour British children's film written and directed by Charles Frend. It was Frend's last feature as director.

Plot

Tom Smith is an only child who dreams of flying. He lives in English suburbia. He spends a lot of time at an abandoned airfield and there he meets a man who has invented a flying bicycle but it will not stay in the air. They decide to adapt it for two cyclists, to give greater power. Their aim is to win £5000 in a competition for the first man-powered flight.

They have a rival team, also based at the airfield, and both are troubled by the security guard and his two Alsatians.

Tom is aided by his friend Porker and his sister Daphne.

A novel based on the script was later published.

Cast
Liam Redmond as Mr. Lovejoy (Graves for business)
William Lucas as Mr. Smith
Ellen McIntosh as Mrs. Smith
Spencer Shires as Tom Smith
Ian Ellis as Bill (Porker)
Della Rands as Daphne
John Howard as Jack
Bill Shine as Wingco
David Lodge as Airfield Guard
Guy Standeven as Squadron Leader
Andrew Venn as Bert
Harold Bennett as Old Man (Drophead Charlie)
Harry Locke as Cycle Shop Owner

Critical reception
TV Guide called it an "Imaginative children's adventure film...not always believable, but this flaw can easily be overlooked given the high energy of the production."

References

External links
The Sky-Bike at IMDb
The Sky-Bike at Spinning Image

1967 films
British children's films
Children's Film Foundation
1960s children's films
Films directed by Charles Frend
1960s English-language films
1960s British films